"Only in My Dreams" is the debut single by American singer-songwriter-actress Debbie Gibson. Released December 16, 1986, as a maxi single (Atlantic DM 86744), and then in remixed form (Vocal/3:50) February 1987, the song was written by Gibson in 1984, two years before she recorded it. Produced by Fred Zarr and engineered by Don Feinberg for BiZarr Music, Inc., mixed by "Little" Louie Vega and mastered by Herb "Pump" Powers, the dance-pop song reached No. 4 on the U.S. Billboard Hot 100 singles chart in the summer of 1987.  Douglas Breitbart for Broadbeard Productions, Inc. served as executive producer (see also Debbie Gibson).

While it did not initially make the UK top 50, 'Dreams' re-entered the UK singles chart in 1988 on the back of the success of her second single (viz., "Shake Your Love," Atlantic UK A9187), eventually peaking at No. 11. The Extended Club Mix/Vocal track (6:34) from DM 86744 was excerpted for a dance medley, "Medley: Out of the Blue/Shake Your Love/Only in My Dreams" (Debbie Gibson Mega Mix), that became Track 4 on Atlantic DM 86556 "Foolish Beat."

A different mix, "Only in My Dreams" (LP Version/3:54), mastered from the original multi-track for DM 86744, became track 3 on Gibson's debut album Out of the Blue (Atlantic LP 81780), and a further variation, "Only in My Dreams (Dream House Mix/10:03)", was Track 3 on Atlantic DM 86556 "Foolish Beat".

Since the song's release, Gibson has re-recorded the song twice: in 1997 for her album Deborah and in 2010 for the Deluxe Edition release of the Japan-exclusive Ms. Vocalist.

The song was voted 95th on VH1's 100 Greatest Songs of the 80s.

Critical reception
Debbi Voller from Number One named "Only in My Dreams" Single of the Week, stating that "it should be a smasheroonie. I predict this girl to be around for a mighty long time. I mean, if she's writing hits like this now — what's she gonna be doing when she's my age?!"

Music video
The accompanying music video for "Only in My Dreams" was recorded as a dream sequence at a beach in Asbury Park, New Jersey, the carousel in the Asbury Park casino (then still in use), and outside the Asbury Park Convention Center. Across the street from the beach is The Stone Pony, where Bruce Springsteen and Bon Jovi got their start. Gibson makes several wardrobe changes during the video, which shows the futility of a teenage girl attempting to get the man of her dreams to look at her, and when he does, she realizes that she was dreaming the whole event, thus causing her world to come crashing down around her.

Track listing

Versions
"Only in my Dreams" [Album Version] – 3:46
"Only in my Dreams" [97 Dance Remix] – 4:36
"Only in my Dreams" [Club Dub] – 4:36
"Only in my Dreams" [Club Mix with Rap] – 4:35
"Only in my Dreams" [Debbie Dreams] – 4:38
"Only in my Dreams" [Dream Dub] – 3:44
"Only in my Dreams" [Extended Club Mix] – 5:55
"Only in my Dreams" [Extended Dance Mix] – 6:27
"Only in my Dreams" [Hot Tracks Mix] – 6:27
"Only in my Dreams" [Rave Radio Version] – 3:44
"Only in my Dreams" [Riff Dub] – 4:22
"Only in my Dreams" [Vasquez Club Mix] – 7:30
"Only in my Dreams" [Video Version] – 3:42

Charts

Weekly charts

Year-end charts

Certifications

1997/98 re-recording

In 1997, Gibson re-recorded the song as "Only in My Dreams" (1997 Dance Edit/4:38), track 14 on her 1997 album Deborah, Revision 1.1 for June 1997. She later released this version in seven variations, including one with a retrofitted eight-measure rap, on Jellybean Recordings DM 2532 'Only in My Dreams 1998' (released February 1998). The basic rhythm is modified from the Dream House Version of the original song.

Track listing

References

External links
 
 
 
 

1986 debut singles
1986 songs
1987 singles
1998 singles
Debbie Gibson songs
Songs written by Debbie Gibson
Atlantic Records singles
Song recordings produced by Fred Zarr
Songs about dreams
Freestyle music songs